Mario Caiano (February 13, 1933 – September 20, 2015) was an Italian film director, screenwriter, producer, art director and second unit director.

Career

Born in Rome, he directed  nearly 50 films between 1961 and 2001 and wrote some 27 films and TV scripts since 1954.

He is primarily known for his work on Spaghetti Westerns, Pepla, Euro Crime and to a slightly lesser degree on horror films. Caiano directed (as Allen Grünewald) and wrote the script for Nightmare Castle (Amanti d'oltretomba, 1965), which stars Barbara Steele.  Eye in the Labyrinth (1972) is a later film in the genre that he directed.

Partial filmography

Footnotes

References

External links
 

1933 births
Horror film directors
Italian film directors
Italian screenwriters
2015 deaths
Writers from Rome
Poliziotteschi directors
Spaghetti Western directors
Italian male screenwriters